Aurico can refer to:
 AuRico Gold, a Canadian gold mining company.
 Aurico, a fictional character from the Power Rangers mini-series Mighty Morphin Alien Rangers